"Solitaires" is a song by American rapper Future featuring American rapper Travis Scott, from the former's eighth studio album High Off Life (2020). It was written by the artists alongside Amir Esmailian and Wheezy, the producer of the song.

Composition
The song finds the rappers detailing their wealthy lifestyles, including flashy diamonds, and living happy lives even as the COVID-19 pandemic is raging, in Auto-Tuned vocals over a trap beat. Future also jokes about needing a psychiatrist.

Critical reception
The song received generally positive reviews. Neil Z. Yeung of AllMusic wrote, "Of the immediate highlights, his Travis Scott collaboration 'Solitaires' is the album's champion, a flawless blend of their complimentary vocal styles and top-notch production by Wheezy that combines bass booms with haunting atmospherics similar to Scott's "Sicko Mode" and "Highest in the Room." Luke Morgan Britton of NME called it "a particular highlight, otherworldly and dizzying", adding, "The song lives up to the album's billing as a cathartic distraction from the real world's ills, as both artists manage to fit quarantine bars into a club-ready banger." HipHopDX's Dana Scott wrote a mixed response to the song, commenting that Travis Scott is "effective" while writing, "But they latch onto the new eye-rolling cliché metaphor of late among rappers about the coronavirus for the hook."

Charts

Certifications

References

2020 songs
Future (rapper) songs
Travis Scott songs
Songs written by Future (rapper)
Songs written by Travis Scott
Songs written by Amir Esmailian
Songs written by Wheezy (record producer)
Song recordings produced by Wheezy (record producer)